Brand New Love is the fourth album by The Go Find released on the 7 February 2014 in Europe and the 18 February 2014 in North America through Morr Music. The title of the album was inspired by the Sebadoh song of the same name.

Track listing

References

The Go Find albums
2014 albums